David H. Bailey may refer to:

David Harold Bailey (born 1948), American mathematician and computer scientist
David Haworth Bailey (1830–1896), US politician and consul to China